Telmatherina wahjui  is a species of fish in the subfamily Telmatherininae, which is part of the family Melanotaeniidae; the rainbowfishes. It is endemic to Indonesia, where it occurs only in Lake Matano on the island of Sulawesi. This species was described in 1991 by Mairice Kottelat with a type locality of Alaponkepi which is situated at the outlet of Lake Matano. The specific name honours Beni N. Wahju who was Vice President and Secretary of P. T. Inco Industries. Mr Wahju's support was vital in ensuring that the ichthyological survey of the Malili Lakes, in which the type of this species was collected, was possible.

Sources

wahjui
Taxa named by Maurice Kottelat
Taxonomy articles created by Polbot
Fish described in 1991